San Rocco is the Italian name of Saint Roch.
San Rocco may also refer to the following places in Italy:
 San Rocco di Piegara, frazione of Roverè Veronese, Verona, Veneto, Italy
 San Rocco al Porto, commune in Province of Lodi, Lombardy, Italy

San Rocco may also refer to the following churches in Italy:
 San Rocco, Capranica, region of Lazio
 San Rocco, Castel del Monte, region of Abruzzo
 San Rocco, Circello, province of Benevento, region of Campania
 San Rocco, Lendinara, province of Rovigo, region of Veneto
 San Rocco, Moliterno, province of Potenza, region of Basilicata
 San Rocco, Piacenza, region of Emilia-Romagna
 San Rocco, Pisa, region of Tuscany
 San Rocco, Potenza, region of Basilicata
 San Rocco, Rome, region of Lazio
 San Rocco, Venice, region of Veneto

San Rocco may also refer to the following fortifications in Malta:
 San Rocco Battery
 San Rocco Redoubt
 Fort Saint Rocco

See also 
 Oratorio di San Rocco (disambiguation)
 Roch (disambiguation), for Saint Roch
 San Roque (disambiguation)